Bihari often refers to:

 of Bihar, a state in central eastern India

Bihari may also refer to:

Populations and languages  

Biharis, people of Bihar
 Bihari languages, a language family
 Languages of Bihar, the languages spoken in Bihar
Bihari diaspora
Bihari Mauritians
Bihari Muslims
Bihari Rajput

People
Bihari Lal (1595–1663), Hindi poet known for the Satasaī
Bihari brothers, American music industry entrepreneurs
János Bihari (1764–1824/1827?), Hungarian Romani violinist
Lal Bihari (born 1955), founder of the Association of the Dead
Mukut Bihari, Indian politician
S. H. Bihari (died 1987), Indian songwriter and poet
Atal Bihari Vajpayee (1924–2018), Prime Minister of India
Binod Bihari Verma (1937–2003), Maithili scholar noted for his work on Panjis

See also
Bihar (disambiguation)
Johnson Beharry VC, British Army soldier of the Princess of Wales's Royal Regiment

Language and nationality disambiguation pages